Spatula Freak is the debut album by Kid Spatula, an alias for Mike Paradinas. It was released in 1995 on Reflective Records. There was an initial limited release LP with alternate, hand-printed artwork on the outer sleeve and prismatic reflective labels on the LP disc.

Track listing

CD release 
 Dance 3 - 5:54
 Chisholm - 3:37
 Xvon - 4:26
 Trunk - 6:05
 Cough - 5:19
 Vampires - 6:56
 Get Up T - 6:53
 Metal Thing #1 - 5:33
 Not Human - 5:35

Vinyl release

Side one 
 Dance 3 - 5:54
 Chisholm - 3:37
 Xvon - 4:26

Side two 
 Trunk - 6:05
 Cough - 5:19

Side three 
 Vampires - 6:56
 Get Up T - 6:53

Side four 
 Metal Thing #1 - 5:33
 Not Human - 5:35

References 

Spatula Freak (CD) at Discogs
Spatula Freak (vinyl) at Discogs

Mike Paradinas albums
1995 albums